These are the Official Charts Company's UK Indie Chart number-one singles of 2013.

Chart history

Notes
 – The single was simultaneously number-one on the singles chart.

Number-one artists

See also
List of UK Singles Chart number ones of the 2010s
List of UK Dance Singles Chart number ones of 2013
List of UK Singles Downloads Chart number ones of the 2000s
List of UK Independent Albums Chart number ones of 2013
List of UK R&B Singles Chart number ones of 2013
List of UK Rock & Metal Singles Chart number ones of 2013

References

External links
Indie Singles Top 40 at the Official Charts Company
UK Top 30 Indie Singles Chart at BBC Radio 1

2013 in British music
United Kingdom Indie Singles
Indie 2013